Christopher Paul Roberts was an English first-class cricketer who played one first-class and one List A game for Worcestershire in 1974.

Born in Cleethorpes, Roberts played for Worcestershire's second team many times between 1971 and 1973, as well as appearing twice for Lincolnshire in the Minor Counties Championship. In mid-August 1974, he produced a startling return of 8-13 for Worcestershire II against Lancashire II in a very low-scoring game that was over in a single day.

After this performance, Roberts was immediately called up to the first team for the John Player League game against Surrey. He took 2-32 (including the wicket of Geoff Howarth) from his eight overs in a match curtailed by the weather (Worcestershire were adjudged the winners on run rate), and was picked to play against Glamorgan in the County Championship at the end of the month. He managed only a single wicket in his 21 overs, that of Arthur Francis.

In 1975 Roberts played only minor cricket, mostly for the Worcestershire second team but also one of the warm-up matches for the World Cup, a 55-over game in which he took the wicket of Gundappa Viswanath. This match did not have List A status, despite the strong sides fielded by both teams.

References

External links
 

1951 births
1977 deaths
People from Cleethorpes
English cricketers
Worcestershire cricketers
Lincolnshire cricketers